The Cathedral Basilica of the Immaculate Conception Also Mazatlán Cathedral Is the main religious building in the city of Mazatlan, in Baroque-Revival style of Sinaloa, Mexico, and home of the Catholic Diocese of Mazatlan. It is located in the historical center.

Work on the temple began in 1856 by order of then Bishop Pedro Loza and Pardavé. Later, parish priest Miguel Lacarra took over the work and it was completed 1899. The temple like basilica was consecrated 12 December 1941.

It consists of basilical plant, with three naves, which have the same height. It has an octagonal dome with lantern, crowned by an iron cross. The towers are of two bodies and present shots in the form of truncated prisms, which are crowned by a cross.

See also
Roman Catholicism in Mexico
Immaculate Conception

References

External links 

Roman Catholic cathedrals in Mexico
Mazatlán
Roman Catholic churches completed in 1899
Basilica churches in Mexico
19th-century Roman Catholic church buildings in Mexico